Count Otto Wilhelm von Königsmarck (5 January 1639 – 5 September 1688) was a German nobleman from Minden, who became Swedish military officer.

Early life 
Königsmarck was born in Northern Germany, as the son of Count Hans Christoff von Königsmarck and his wife, Barabara Maria Agathe von Leesten (1608-1671). He was brother of Count Conrad Christoff von Königsmarck and uncle of Aurora von Königsmarck, Amalia Wilhelmina von Königsmarck, Philip Christoph von Königsmarck and Karl Johann von Königsmarck.

Education 
After his parents settled in Stade in 1645, his mother ensured that her son had a good education. Initially, Königsmarck was probably taught by the scholar Johann Heinrich Tonsor, but Esaias von Pufendorf was his preceptor (private tutor). He studied at the University of Jena for over three years, where he became Rector magnificus due to his noble descent. He then briefly visited the universities in Tübingen, Strasbourg, Basel, then the University of Geneva, Blois and Angers and did the Grand Tour that was customary at the time.

Career 
he attained the rank of field marshal in 1676, commanded the Battle of Stralsund (1678), and became Governor General for Swedish Pomerania from 1679 to 1687. Alongside Francesco Morosini, he led the Venetian conquest of the Morea in the early years of the Morean War, and died of the plague during the Siege of Negroponte (1688).

Personal life 
He was married to Countess Catharina Charlotta De la Gardie (1655-1697), daughter of Count Magnus Gabriel De la Gardie and his wife, Princess Maria Euphrosyne of Zweibrücken-Kleeburg. They didn't have children.

Notes

1639 births
1688 deaths
People from Minden
Swedish people of German descent
Swedish nobility
Field marshals of Sweden
People from Minden (state)
Swedish Pomerania
People of the Great Turkish War
17th-century Swedish military personnel
People of the Ottoman–Venetian Wars
Ambassadors of Sweden to France